Amolops tuberodepressus is a species of frog in the family Ranidae. It is endemic to Yunnan, China and known from Wuliang and Ailao Mountains in Jingdong County. Once suspected to be synonym of Amolops mantzorum, its validity was confirmed with molecular methods in 2014.

Description
Adult males measure  and adult females  in snout–vent length. The overall appearance is moderately depressed and slender. The head is depressed and slightly longer than it is wide. The snout is rounded. The tympanum is distinct. The fingers and toes bear large discs; the toes are webbed. Dorsal ground color ranges from brown to greenish. The dorsal pattern consists of rounded or irregular green or bluish green spots. The flanks are green with irregular dark brown spots. The limbs are green with brown crossbars. The belly is yellowish cream and the throat is grey. The iris is brown with irregular bright small yellow spots.

Habitat and conservation
It is threatened by habitat loss caused by small-scale wood extraction and small hydroelectric dams.

References

tuberodepressus
Frogs of China
Endemic fauna of Yunnan
Amphibians described in 2000